The year 1842 in science and technology involved some significant events, listed below.

Botany
 Nathaniel Bagshaw Ward publishes On the Growth of Plants in Closely Glazed Cases in London, promoting his concept of the Wardian case.

Exploration
 Antarctic explorer James Clark Ross charts the eastern side of James Ross Island and on January 23 reaches a Farthest South of 78°09'30"S.

Medicine
 January – American medical student William E. Clarke of Berkshire Medical College becomes the first person to administer an inhaled anesthetic to facilitate a surgical procedure (dental extraction).
 March 30 – American physician and pharmacist Crawford Long administers an inhaled anesthetic (diethyl ether) to facilitate a surgical procedure (removal of a neck tumor).
 English surgeon William Bowman publishes On the Structure and Use of the Malpighian Bodies of the Kidney, identifying Bowman's capsule, a key component of the nephron.
 Edwin Chadwick's critical Report on an inquiry into the Sanitary Condition of the Labouring Population of Great Britain is published by the Poor Law Commission.

Paleontology
 Palaeontologist Richard Owen coins the name Dinosauria, hence the Anglicized dinosaur.

Physics
 Christian Doppler proposes the Doppler effect.
 Julius Robert von Mayer proposes that work and heat are equivalent. This is independently discovered in 1843 by James Prescott Joule, who names it "mechanical equivalent of heat".

Technology
 January 8 – Delft University of Technology established by William II of the Netherlands as a 'Royal Academy for the education of civilian engineers'.
 February 21 – John Greenough is granted the first U.S. patent for the sewing machine.
 June – James Nasmyth patents his design of steam hammer in England and introduces an improved planing machine.
 John Herschel discovers the cyanotype (blueprint) photographic process in England.

Events
 September 14–17 – English naturalist Charles Darwin and his family settle at Down House in Kent.

Awards
 Copley Medal: James MacCullagh
 Wollaston Medal: Leopold von Buch

Births
 February 2 – Julian Sochocki (died 1927), Polish mathematician.
 February 10 – Agnes Mary Clerke (died 1907) Irish astronomer and author.
 February 22 – Camille Flammarion (died 1925), French astronomer.
 March 17 – Rosina Heikel (died 1929), Finnish physician.
 April 4 – Édouard Lucas (died 1891, French mathematician.
 May 7 – Isala Van Diest (died 1916), Belgian physician.
 May 8 – Emil Christian Hansen (died 1909), Danish fermentation physiologist.
 June 11 – Carl von Linde (died 1934), German refrigeration engineer.
 August 23 – Osborne Reynolds (died 1912), Irish-born physicist.
 September 9 – Elliott Coues (died 1899), American ornithologist.
 September 20
 James Dewar (died 1923), Scottish-born chemist.
 Charles Lapworth (died 1920), English geologist.
 October 17 – Gustaf Retzius (died 1919), Swedish anatomist.
 October 24 (O.S. October 12) – Nikolai Menshutkin (died 1907), Russian chemist.
 November 12 – John William Strutt, 3rd Baron Rayleigh (died 1919), English Nobel Prize-winning physicist.
 December 3 – Ellen Swallow Richards (d. 1911), American chemist.
 December 17 – Sophus Lie (died 1899), Norwegian mathematician.

Deaths
 February 15 – Archibald Menzies (born 1754), Scottish-born botanist.
 April 28 – Charles Bell (born 1774), Scottish-born anatomist.
 May 8 – Jules Dumont d'Urville (born 1790), French explorer.
 June 9 - Maria Dalle Donne (born 1778), Bolognese physician 
 June 30 – Thomas Coke, Earl of Leicester (born 1754), English agriculturalist and geneticist.
 July 19 – Pierre Joseph Pelletier (born 1788), French chemist.
 July 25 – Dominique Jean Larrey (born 1766), French military surgeon, pioneer of battlefield medicine.

References

 
19th century in science
1840s in science